Richard Roderham was a medieval churchman and university Vice-Chancellor and Chancellor.

Roderham attended Balliol College, Oxford.  He was Chancellor of the Church of Hereford.
He became Vice-Chancellor of the University of Oxford twice during 1426–1430 and 1431–1433. In 1433, he became the Rector of Grey Friars, Oxford. He acted as the Chancellor of Oxford University for the period 1440–1.

References

Bibliography
 

Year of birth missing
Year of death missing
Alumni of Balliol College, Oxford
Wardens of Greyfriars, Oxford
Vice-Chancellors of the University of Oxford
Chancellors of the University of Oxford
15th-century English people
15th-century English clergy